KS Lublinianka is a Polish professional football club based in Lublin. It was founded in 1921 as WKS Lublin (Wojskowy Klub Sportowy Lublin, English: Military Sports Club) and was supported by the Lublin garrison of the Polish Army. In 1923 WKS Lublin was renamed to Klub Sportowy Lublinianka. In 1938 the club won the Football Junior Championships of Poland. They spent eleven seasons in the Polish First League and in the 1969–70 season they reached the quarterfinals of the Polish Cup. Lublinianka currently plays in the III liga, group IV.

Lublinianka is the oldest sports organization in the city of Lublin, and one of the oldest in the region. It continues the traditions of pre-war Wojskowy Klub Sportowy (Military Sports Club) Unia Lublin. The origins of Lublinianka date back to 1921. At that time, it had two departments: football, and track and field. In 1923, the organization split into WKS Lublin and KS Lublinianka, to be reunited in 1927 as WKS Unia.

Names  
 1921 Wojskowy Klub Sportowy Lublin,
 1923 Klub Sportowy Lublinianka,
 1926 Wojskowy Klub Sportowy Unia Lublin,
 1944 Wojskowy Klub Sportowy Lublinianka,
 1950 Ogniwo Wojskowy Klub Sportowy Lublin,
 1953 Garnizonowy Wojskowy Klub Sportowy Lublin,
 1954 Ogniwo Lublin,
 1955 Wojskowy Klub Sportowy Lublinianka,
 1994 Klub Sportowy Lublinianka,
 2002 Klub Sportowy Lublinianka Sportowa Spółka Akcyjna,
 2011 Klub Sportowy Lublinianka – Wieniawa,
 2013 Klub Sportowy Lublinianka

Timeline     
 summer 1921 – Wojskowy Klub Sportowy (WKS, Military Sports Club) Lublin is formed by Colonel Felicjan Sterba of the Polish Army
 1923 – Reserve team of WKS Lublin forms Klub Sportowy Lublinianka (KSL)
 1924 – Lublinianka wins regional championship of A Class
 1925 – Lublinianka qualifies to national championship playoffs, losing to the champion, Pogoń Lwów
 1926 – Lublinianka qualifies to national championship playoffs, losing to Pogoń Lwów and Cracovia. As a result of these failures, Lublinianka merges with WKS Lublin, forming WKS Unia
 1927, 1928, 1930 – Unia wins regional championship, but fails to qualify to the Ekstraklasa
 1938 – U-19 team of Unia wins the championship of Poland. In the final game (June 4, 1939), it beats Wisła Kraków 3–2
 1944 – end of German occupation of Lublin, and return of WKS Lublinianka
 1946 – WKS Lublinianka wins regional championship
 1949 – Lublinianka qualifies to the Second Division, finishing the season in the second spot, after Garbarnia Kraków
 1950 – the organization changes the name into Ogniwo Wojskowy Klub Sportowy (OWKS) Lublin
 1951 – OWKS Lublin finishes second in the Second League, behind Gwardia Warszawa, to be relegated to the Third Division in 1953
 1953 – the third level of Polish football system is reorganized. The so-called Inter-Voivodeship Leagues are created. OWKS Lublin is renamed into GWKS Lublin (Garnizonowy Wojskowy Klub Sportowy)
 1955 – Ogniwo Lublin is renamed into Lublinianka
 1957, 1958 – Lublinianka wins the regional championship
 1960 – after winning the regional championship, WKS Unia qualifies to the Second Division playoffs. It beats Lotnik Warszawa and Gwardia Białystok, to face Hutnik Kraków, Arka Gdynia, Górnik Wałbrzych, AKS Chorzów, and Górnik Konin. Final game of the competition (November 1960, vs. Górnik Wałbrzych) is attended by 20,000 fans. WKS Unia wins 2–0. Soon afterwards, WKS Lublinianka and WKS Unia merge to form WKS Lublinianka
 1961 – Lublinianka is relegated back to the third level. The U19 team wins bronze medal in Polish Championships
 1961–1962 – Lublinianka loses the playoffs to the local rival, Motor Lublin
 1963 – Kazimierz Górski becomes the manager of Lublinianka. The team wins promotion to the second division, to remain there until 1965
 1969 – the U19 team wins silver in the Championship of Poland
 1969–1970 – Lublinianka reaches the quarterfinals of the Polish Cup, to be eliminated by Górnik Zabrze (1–1 in Lublin, 2–5 in Zabrze)
 1972–1973 – Lublinianka again reaches the quarterfinals of the Polish Cup, to be eliminated by Legia Warszawa (0–0, 1–5). In June 1973, Lublinianka returns to the second division, to be relegated after one year
 1982–1983, 1994–1995, 1995–1996 – Lublinianka plays in the Second Division, to be relegated after one year

See also 
Ekstraklasa 1946

Sources 
 History of Lublinianka, in Polish. Retrieved December 2, 2015

External links 
Lublinianka website

KS Lublinianka
Football clubs in Lublin
Association football clubs established in 1921
1921 establishments in Poland
Military association football clubs in Poland